Fintonia is a village and seat of the chiefdom of Tambakha in Bombali District in the Northern Province of Sierra Leone.

Villages in Sierra Leone
Northern Province, Sierra Leone